The South Africa men's national tennis team represents South Africa in Davis Cup tennis competition and are governed by the Tennis South Africa.

South Africa won the Davis Cup in 1974 by default as India withdrew from the finals as a protest against apartheid policies. They currently compete in Group II of the Europe/Africa Zone. They competed in the World Group from 1995–1998.

History 
South Africa competed in its first Davis Cup in 1913. Their player with the most single wins all-time is Cliff Drysdale with 32 and in doubles it is Frew McMillan with 23.

Current team (2022) 

 Philip Henning
 Lleyton Cronje
 Raven Klaasen
 Christo van Rensburg (Captain-player)

All players

References

External links 

Davis Cup teams
Davis Cup